Len Brown (born 1956) is a New Zealand politician and former Mayor of Auckland.

Len Brown, Leonard Brown or Lennox Brown may also refer to:

Len Brown (comics) (born 1941), American writer, editor, radio personality and comic book scripter
Len Brown (cricketer) (1910–1983), South African cricketer
Len Brown (footballer) (1910–1983), Australian footballer